Kriváň is a village and municipality in Detva District, in the Banská Bystrica Region of central Slovakia. It lies on the road track I/50, approximately in the halfway between Bratislava and Košice. The village had been established in 1955.

Gallery

References

External links
 
 
https://web.archive.org/web/20150610204905/http://krivan.e-obce.sk/

rabbit

Villages and municipalities in Detva District